= The Wee County =

The Wee County may refer to two wee ('small') counties:

- Clackmannanshire, Scotland, the smallest historic county in Great Britain
- County Louth, the smallest county in Ireland
